Kouadio Guy Sèrge Brou (born 2 June 1991) is an Ivorian football player who plays for Rabo de Peixe.

Club career
He made his professional debut in the Segunda Liga for UD Oliveirense on 23 January 2016 in a game against C.D. Santa Clara.

In 2020, Brou signed with Rabo de Peixe in the Campeonato de Portugal.

References

1991 births
People from Lagunes District
Living people
Ivorian footballers
Ivorian expatriate footballers
Expatriate footballers in Morocco
Botola players
U.D. Oliveirense players
Expatriate footballers in Portugal
Liga Portugal 2 players
Gil Vicente F.C. players
C.D. Fátima players
S.C. Farense players
Ideal SC players
Association football wingers
Wydad de Fès players
Campeonato de Portugal (league) players